The Soomra dynasty was a late medieval dynasty of Sindh, and at times adjacent regions, located in what is now Pakistan.

Sources 
The only extant source is the Diwan-i Farruhi, a Persian chronicle by Abul-Hasan Ali describing Mahmud of Ghazni's invasion (1025 AD) of Mansura, the erstwhile capital of Sindh. Contemporary coinage from Sindh is scarce and of poor quality with offset flans — while some of them can be read to contain the name of Al-Zahir li-i'zaz Din Allah and Al-Mustansir Billah, the Fatimid Caliphs from 1021 until 1094, then, they lack in the name of the issuer and cannot evidence the dynasty.

History

Establishment
The early history of Soomras is sketchy. Ali describes the flight and eventual death by drowning of Hafif (var. Khafif), then-ruler of Sindh, during the faceoff with Mahmud but does not specify whether he was the last Habbarid or first Soomra. Later chroniclers like Ali ibn al-Athir (c. late 12th c.) and Ibn Khaldun (c. late 14th c.) attributed the fall of Habbarids to Mahmud of Ghazni, lending credence to the argument of Hafif being the last Habbarid. The Soomras appear to have established themselves as a regional power in this vacuum.

They have been retrospectively claimed to be Parmar Rajputs but without proof. Some of them were adherents of Isma'ilism — Arab travelers held them to be Qarmatians, and correspondence with the Fatimid caliph, Al-Mustansir Billah has been located.

Territory 
The Ghurids and Ghaznavids continued to rule parts of Sindh, across the eleventh and early twelfth century, alongside Soomras. The precise delineations have yet to be discovered, but the Soomras were probably centered in lower Sindh.  One of their kings Shimuddin Chamisar had submitted to Iltutmish, the Sultan of Delhi, and was allowed to continue as a vassal.

See Also
 List of Monarchs of Sindh

Notes

References 

History of Sindh
Medieval India
Hindu dynasties
Dynasties of India
Sindh
Empires and kingdoms of India